The 2022 Rally New Zealand (also known as the Repco Rally New Zealand 2022) was a motor racing event for rally cars that was held over four days between 29 September and 2 October 2022. It would mark the forty-fifth running of the Rally New Zealand. The event was the eleventh round of the 2022 World Rally Championship, World Rally Championship-2 and World Rally Championship-3.

Sébastien Loeb and Daniel Elena were the overall reigning rally winners, but they would not defend their titles.

Kalle Rovanperä and Jonne Halttunen won their sixth rally of the season and became the 2022 World Champions. Their team, Toyota Gazoo Racing WRT, were the manufacturers' winners. Hayden Paddon and John Kennard won the World Rally Championship-2 category.

Background

Entry list
The following crews entered into the rally. The event was opened to crews competing in the World Rally Championship, its support categories, the World Rally Championship-2 and World Rally Championship-3, and privateer entries that were not registered to score points in any championship. Eleven were set to enter under Rally1 regulations, as were twelve Rally2 crews in the World Rally Championship-2.

Itinerary
All dates and times are NZST (UTC+12).

Report

WRC Rally1

Classification

Special stages

Championship standings
Bold text indicates 2022 World Champions.

WRC-2 Rally2

Classification

Special stages

Championship standings
Bold text indicates 2022 World Champions.

WRC-3 Rally3
No Rally3 crews entered the round.

Championship standings

References

External links
  
 2022 Rally New Zealand at ewrc-results.com
 2022 Rally New Zealand at rally-maps.com 

Rally New Zealand
Rally
New Zealand
October 2022 sports events in New Zealand
September 2022 sports events in New Zealand